He Zixian (born February 4, 1976) is a Chinese Grand Prix motorcycle racer.

Career statistics

By season

Races by year

(key)

References

External links
http://www.motogp.com/en/riders/Zi+Xian+He

1976 births
Living people
Chinese motorcycle racers
250cc World Championship riders